The Deanna Rose Children's Farmstead is a family attraction in Overland Park, Kansas.  The facility shows farm animals, birds of prey, show gardens, butterfly gardens, a nature trail, a Kanza Native American display, and a full-scale one-room schoolhouse.  The facility also provides playgrounds, a fishing pond, horse-drawn wagon rides, and pony rides.

The facility began as a petting zoo in 1978 and was renamed in 1985 to honor Deanna Rose, an Overland Park police officer.  Rose was the first Overland Park police officer killed in the line of duty.

In 2014, the site began hosting an elaborate Christmas light display around the Christmas Holiday Season.

References

External links
 Official site

Museums in Johnson County, Kansas
Farm museums in the United States
Buildings and structures in Overland Park, Kansas
Open-air museums in Kansas